is a former Japanese football player.

Playing career
Morishige was born in Kagoshima Prefecture on October 21, 1971. After graduating from Nara Sangyo University, he joined Japan Football League club Cerezo Osaka in 1994. The club won the champions in 1994 and was promoted to J1 League. Although he played as defender, he could not play many matches and retired end of 1995 season.

Club statistics

References

External links

1971 births
Living people
Nara Gakuen University alumni
Association football people from Kagoshima Prefecture
Japanese footballers
J1 League players
Japan Football League (1992–1998) players
Cerezo Osaka players
Association football defenders